Lodovico Manni (Campodarsego, 10 January 1986) is an Italian rugby union player.
His usual position is as a Lock and he currently plays for Rangers Vicenza in Serie A.

For 2013–14 Pro12 season, he was an Additional Player for Zebre.

In 2006, Saccardo was also named in the Italy Under 21 squad.

References

External links 
It's Rugby England Profile
Eurosport Profile

Italian rugby union players
Zebre Parma players
Petrarca Rugby players
1986 births
Living people
Rugby union locks
Rugby Roma Olimpic players
Sportspeople from the Province of Padua
Cavalieri Prato players